Trinity Church (also referred to as Protestant Episcopal Church) is a Protestant church situated on Langjiaguai Street in the county-level city of Langzhong, Nanchong, Sichuan Province. Founded in 1893, the building is the city's oldest surviving Anglican church, formerly belonging to the Szechwan Diocese of the Church in China.

History 

Trinity Church was built in 1893 in traditional Sichuanese architectural style, under the supervision of William Cassels, one of the Cambridge Seven who was going to be the missionary bishop of the Diocese of Western China.

As the first Anglican church built in Langzhong (then known as Paoning), the chosen style is in consideration of being more acceptable to the locals. It adopted the style of traditional residential buildings in northern Sichuan, fully blended into the surroundings.

The British explorer Isabella Bird described in her book The Yangtze Valley and Beyond, that the church 'is Chinese in style, the chancel windows are "glazed" with coloured paper to simulate stained glass, and it is seated for two hundred'. Despite its small size, 'the church was crammed at matins, and crowds stood outside, where they could both see and hear, this publicity contrasting with the Roman practice.'

More than ten years of missionary work yielded visible results, Trinity Church was no longer capable of accommodating the growing congregation. Implementation of a cathedral construction project started in 1908, after a series of problems, the neo-Gothic Cathedral of St John the Evangelist was eventually built on Yangtianjing Street, just 50 metres away from Trinity Church.

After the communist takeover of China in 1949, Christian Churches in China were forced to sever their ties with respective overseas Churches, which has thus led to the merging of Trinity Church into the communist-established Three-Self Patriotic Church.

Today, the traditional environment has long gone. Trinity Church, however, maintains its original style, with its serenity that is free from the bustling tourist area nearby.

See also 
 Anglicanism in Sichuan
 Gospel Church, Mianyang
 Gospel Church, Wanzhou
 St John's Church, Chengdu

References 

19th-century Anglican church buildings
19th-century churches in China
Langzhong
Protestant churches in China
Traditional Chinese architecture
Churches completed in the 1890s
Buildings and structures in Nanchong